"Stan", also known by its inventory number BHI 3033, is a Tyrannosaurus rex fossil found in the Hell Creek Formation in South Dakota, just outside of Buffalo in 1987, and excavated in 1992. It is the fifth most complete T. rex fossil discovered to date, at more than 70% bulk. In October 2020, the fossil was sold for $31.8 million at auction, making it the most expensive dinosaur specimen and fossil ever sold.  In March 2022 Abu Dhabi's Department of Culture and Tourism stated that they had acquired Stan and were planning on displaying the fossil at a new museum of natural history slated to open in 2025.

Discovery 
Stan Sacrison, an amateur paleontologist, was responsible for the initial discovery of Stan's bone fragments, and as a result is the namesake for the T. rex. He was out looking at plant life in South Dakota when he spotted Stan's pelvis visible in the side of a cliff. At the time, Sacrison was doing freelance work for the Black Hills Geological Institute. Originally, it was thought that the fossil was that of a Triceratops.

The excavation itself required the skills and resources of the Black Hills Institute; it officially began on 11 July 1992, led by Peter Larson (the lead paleontologist on the excavations of many other T. rex specimens like Sue and Trix as well as the institute's president). The institute's team removed the rock above Stan's skeleton with a Bobcat and finer removal was done manually with picks and brushes until the fossils could be plotted and diagrammed with the help of a grid placed over the dig site. The bones were then wrapped in burlap and plaster and brought to the Black Hills Institute.

Description 

The most notable aspect of Stan is his nearly complete and perfectly preserved skull. It is widely regarded as the best T. rex skull ever discovered. Although the bones were separated from each other before excavation, they were in pristine condition and ideal for study by researchers. According to Pete Larson of the Black Hills Institute, Stan's skull has enabled scientists to learn more about the T. rex's cranial kinesis, or movement of the skull bones, than any other T. rex specimen. Because of Stan's narrow pelvis, paleontologists are confident that the specimen is male.

Preparation 

The bones of Stan the T. rex were cleaned and prepared at the Black Hills Institute where resident paleontologists and paleobotanists continued to study him and the fossilized plants he was discovered with. The institute has performed two additional excavations of the site that Stan was discovered, yielding 199 of the 350 known bones of the T. rex, more than 70% in bulk, which made Stan the second most complete T. rex until 2017.

Since then, additional excavations for other known T. rex specimens, as well as new discoveries regarding the T. rex "Scotty" (RSM P2523.8) in 2019, have made Stan the fifth most complete T. rex. However, BHI 3033 is still one of the most famous T. rex discoveries, and more than sixty casts of the skeleton are on display and requested by museums all around the world.

Life and death 
Stan's fossils show notable signs of wear and indication that the dinosaur experienced multiple attacks and illnesses throughout his life. Puncture wounds on the back of his skull and rib indicate that he was at one point bitten by another T. rex. Other bite marks at the base of his skull suggest his neck was once broken and caused the fusion of two vertebrate, resulting in a loss of mobility and pain for the rest of his life. The injury spurred the growth of excess bone around his neck, showing a remarkable recovery. Other irregularities in Stan's skull include non-symmetrical holes on either side of his jaw with smoothed edges, which are indications that these are more healed wounds.

According to the Black Hills Institute, Stan likely lived in a family unit of other T. rex. His mate could have been the cause of some of his injuries. Stan likely ate hadrosaurids, also known as duck-billed dinosaurs, such as Edmontosaurus. It is unknown what exactly caused Stan's death, but many theories suggest that it could have been the result of old age, starvation due to limited mobility from his injuries, or even parasitic infections that many T. rex exhibit signs of.

In 2005, the BBC program The Truth About Killer Dinosaurs used Stan's skull as a model for their hydraulic test of the T. rex's bite force and estimated that it exceeded 6.8 tonnes. Additional tests, like those published by Karl T. Bates and colleagues in 2009, used Stan's remains to study the weight distribution of T.rex, as well as how their mass and proportions would have affected their movement. Bates et al. estimated that Stan was larger than previous belief, at around 16,875 pounds (7.6 tonnes); they also concluded that Stan, as well as other Tyrannosaurus rex specimens, were much more robust than commonly believed.

Exhibition 

It took more than 30,000 hours for the Black Hills Institute to prepare the fossil for display; he was the centerpiece for the opening of the T. rex World Exhibition and toured around Japan before coming to reside in the Black Hills Institute's Hall of Dinosaurs. Stan is the most duplicated T. rex fossil, and as a result, more people have seen Stan (and casts of Stan) than any other Tyrannosaurus.

The New Mexico Museum of Natural History is home to a cast of BHI 3033. The museum purchased the cast in 2008, and it remains a center piece of the museum, which is home to numerous other dinosaur fossils, notable T. rex skulls, and skull fragments. Another cast resides at Walt Disney World Resort in Orlando, Florida, which is also home to a cast of Sue.

Other casts are displayed at the Houston Museum of Natural Science, the National Museum of Natural History (Washington, D.C.), the National Museum of Natural Science (Tokyo), the Sternberg Museum of Natural History (Fort Hays, Kansas), the Museum of Natural Sciences (Brussels, Belgium), the Wyoming Dinosaur Center (Thermopolis, Wyoming), the Manchester Museum (Manchester, UK), the Museo Civico di Storia Naturale di Milano (Milan, Italy), the Children's Museum of Indianapolis, Indiana, the Dinosaur Discovery Museum (Kenosha, WI), the Weis Earth Science Museum (Menasha, WI), and The Museum of Ancient Life at Thanksgiving Point (Lehi, UT). While it has been reported that the Googleplex T. rex replica in Mountain View, California, United States is a replica of BHI-3033, it is actually a cast of MOR-555

The auction house Christie's sold Stan in New York, as part of its 20th Century Evening Sale, on October 6, 2020. Stan sold for $31.8 million to an anonymous buyer making it the most expensive fossil ever sold. During a Manningcast broadcast of a National Football League playoff game on January 17, 2022, Dwayne "The Rock" Johnson was interviewed by Peyton and Eli Manning while at his home. Eli noted a T. rex skull in the background of Johnson's camera view; Johnson explained that the T. rex was named Stan, how it received its name, and how it was discovered. This led some to believe that Johnson was the anonymous buyer of Stan. However, Johnson and the Black Hills Institute confirmed that he owns a replica skull and not the real specimen. On March 23, 2022, it was announced that Stan is to be the centerpiece of the under construction Natural History Museum Abu Dhabi.

Intellectual property
Stan's skeleton, including original and restored elements, is a registered copyright of Black Hills Institute of Geological Research with the registration number of VA0001745359. This copyright was defended in 2010 when it was noticed that casts of "Peck's rex" contained unmodified cast replicas of elements of both Sue and Stan.

Reportedly, Stan's skeleton has lived on and much of it has been copied as part of a Tyranosaurus named "Shen."  The latter skeleton was scheduled to be auctioned off in Asia at Christie's on November 30, 2022.  Given the fact that much of the skeleton is Stan replication, Shen has been withdrawn, and will likely wind up in a museum.

See also

 Big John (dinosaur)
 Black Beauty (dinosaur)
 Dippy
 Jane (dinosaur)
 Peck's Rex
 Specimens of Tyrannosaurus
 Sue (dinosaur)
 Timeline of tyrannosaur research
 Titus (dinosaur)
 Trix (dinosaur)
List of dinosaur specimens sold at auction

References 

Tyrannosaurus
Dinosaur fossils
Paleontology in South Dakota